"The One with Russ" is the tenth episode of Friends second season. It first aired on the NBC network in the United States on January 4, 1996.

Plot
Monica gets back together with her old boyfriend, Fun Bobby. When the group discovers that they somehow went through five bottles of wine, they realise exactly what puts the "Fun" in Fun Bobby: alcohol. Monica convinces him to quit drinking, which turns out to be a bad idea – he becomes, as Chandler refers to him, "Ridiculously Dull Bobby". In order to put up with Bobby's boring stories, Monica develops a drinking habit of her own. Bobby then dumps her because he does not feel he can be in a co-dependent relationship.

Meanwhile, Rachel starts dating Russ, a periodontist who bears an eerie resemblance to Ross (although at first, Rachel thinks Russ reminds her of Bob Saget). She remains oblivious to the group's concerns until she catches Ross and Russ arguing, sees the similarities, and freaks out.

Joey's agent, Estelle, gets him an audition for a part on Days of Our Lives. However, the female casting agent implies that he will get the part if he sleeps with her; Joey is conflicted, wanting to advance his career but not wanting it to be because of a fling. At the audition, he refuses to sleep with the casting agent, but as he leaves, she offers him an even bigger role, Dr. Drake Ramoray, which he accepts. He then tells the other friends that he has to shower, implying he slept with the casting agent for the part.

At the end of the episode, Russ comes into Central Perk and reveals to Chandler and Phoebe that Rachel broke up with him, telling him he reminds her too much of someone else but she cannot figure out who. Julie then arrives to give Ross some of his stuff back. She locks eyes with Russ and they fall in love at first sight. In a scene cut from the original broadcast, Russ and Julie then leave the coffeehouse together.

Reception
In the original broadcast, the episode was viewed by 32.2 million viewers.

Sam Ashurst from Digital Spy ranked the episode #52 on their ranking of the 236 Friends episodes, and wrote: "One of the most significant episodes, even if it's probably not the funniest".

Telegraph & Argus also ranked the episode #52 on their ranking of all 236 Friends episodes.

References

1996 American television episodes
Friends (season 2) episodes